Roger de Beauvoir (8 November 1806, Paris – 27 August 1866) was the pen name of French Romantic novelist and playwright Eugène Augustin Nicolas Roger.

Life
His wit, good-looks and adventurous lifestyle made him well known in Paris, where he was a friend of Alexandre Dumas, père. 
Of independent means, he wed actress and author Léocadie Doze in 1847. 
He was imprisoned for three months and fined 500 francs for a satirical poem, Mon Procs, written in 1849. 
Afflicted with gout and nearly destitute from his flamboyant lifestyle, he spent the last few years of his life unhappily confined to a chair, dying in Paris. 

His best-known works included Le Chevalier de Saint-Georges (1840), Les Oeufs de Paques (1856) and Le Pauvre Diable (reprinted 1871).

Bibliography
 La Cape et l'Épée
 Histoires cavalières - La Lescombat: Le Moulin D'heilly. David Dick (1834). Les Eaux Des Pyrénées. Mademoiselle De Sens
 Duels et duellistes
 Le Chevalier de Saint-Georges (novel and play)
 L'Écolier de Cluny
 Les Soirs au Lido
 Les Oeufs de Paques
 Le Café Procope
 L'Auberge des Trois Pins
 Les Soupeurs de mon temps
 La Lescombat
 Les Aventurieres
 Le Pauvre Diable
 Colombes et couleuvres, etc.

References

Attribution

External links
 Works by Roger de Babylon at the Bibliothèque nationale
 
 

1806 births
1866 deaths
Writers from Paris
19th-century French dramatists and playwrights
Burials at Père Lachaise Cemetery
19th-century French novelists
French male novelists
19th-century French male writers